Funairi-minami is a Hiroden station on the Hiroden Eba Line located in Funairi-minami, Naka-ku, Hiroshima. It is operated by the Hiroshima Electric Railway.

Routes
There are three routes that serve Funairi-minami Station:
 Hiroshima Station - Eba Route
 Yokogawa Station - Eba Route
 Hakushima - Eba Route

Station layout
The station consists of two staggered side platforms serving two tracks. Crosswalks connect the platforms with the sidewalk. There is a small shelter located on each platform.

Adjacent stations

Bus connections
Hiroden Bus Route #6 at Funairi-minami bus stop

Surrounding area
Hiroshima City Commercial High School
Funairi Shrine

History
Opened on June 20, 1944.
Renamed to "Eba-guchi" on November 1, 1947.
Renamed to "Gurando-guchi" on January 8, 1954.
Renamed to "Funairi-minami-machi" in 1960.
Moved in 2002.
Renamed to "Funairi-minami" on April 1, 2019.

See also

Hiroden Streetcar Lines and Routes

References

Funairi-minami-machi Station
Railway stations in Japan opened in 1944